The 3200 N Central Building, formally known as Great American Tower, is a high-rise office building located along Central Avenue in the Uptown area of Phoenix, Arizona, United States. Owned by DPC Companies and Bridge Commercial Real Estate, 3200 N Central was built in 1985. Upon completion it stood as the sixth-tallest building in Phoenix, and today it stands as the 19th-tallest building in the city.

The building was developed by Oxford Properties who also developed its neighbor 3300 North Central Avenue. Skidmore, Owings & Merrill was the architect, and Westbrook Construction was the contractor.

Like its next-door neighbor, the 3300 North Central Avenue, 3200 N Central is rotated 45 degrees from the street grid. It is, however, an eight sided building with a 45-degree angle cut into each of the four corners. 3200 N Central is designed in the Post Modern style. It features exterior columns and spandrels giving the tower an angular, repetitive appearance. The top floor plate is smaller than the rest of the tower and features a balcony, which rings the outer perimeter with the exception of its 45-degree corners.

See also
 List of tallest buildings in Phoenix

Notes

Skyscraper office buildings in Phoenix, Arizona
Office buildings completed in 1985
1985 establishments in Arizona